Buena Vista (Spanish for "good view") is a brand name that has historically been used for divisions and subsidiaries of The Walt Disney Company, whose primary studios, the Walt Disney Studios, are located on Buena Vista Street in Burbank, California. The studio lot is also home to the company's corporate headquarters, the Team Disney Burbank building. The logos for the various Buena Vista brands featured the "Buena Vista" wordmark superimposed over the traditional Disney castle logo to signal the affiliation between Buena Vista and Disney.

History 
The brand was originally used for the Buena Vista Film Distribution Company, which had been established by Walt and Roy O. Disney to distribute The Living Desert (1953) after RKO Radio Pictures, Disney's longtime distributor, refused to. The company would go on to distribute all of Disney's future films, though some were still distributed by RKO until 1956 because of preexisting contracts. Disney semi-retired the Buena Vista name in May 2007 and the company was designated Walt Disney Studios Motion Pictures.

The Walt Disney World Resort is located in the city of Lake Buena Vista, Florida. The city's namesake lake was known as Black Lake before Walt Disney Enterprises acquired the land in the 1960s. The entrance area and themed land of Buena Vista Street at Disney California Adventure Park at the Disneyland Resort also makes reference to the brand and real-life street in Burbank.

In 1994, the first Spanish-language production emerged from Buena Vista Productions International, "Navidad en las Americas", a holiday program that aired on the Univision network.

In 1996, Buena Vista International was described as the "international distribution division of the Walt Disney Company", including "marketing and distribution" of films in the United Kingdom (as of 1995), and Japan (as of 2005).

Reorganization
The following Buena Vista brands have been retired or renamed to a Disney and/or ABC name, in accordance with the company's branding strategy. Buena Vista Home Entertainment, Buena Vista Records and Lake Buena Vista, however, have not changed their names. Gaumont Buena Vista International, however, was a joint venture between Gaumont Film Company and the Walt Disney Company, established in January 1993. GBVI ensured the distribution of films of its two parent companies in France. After 11 years of existence, it was dissolved in 2004 as Disney prefers to distribute its own films as Buena Vista International (France). Buena Vista was revived as a name, Buena Vista Theatrical, for the former Fox Stage Production as a Disney Theatrical Group division.

Notes

References

American brands
Disney jargon
The Walt Disney Company